The Legal system of Argentina is a Civil law legal system. The pillar of the Civil system is the Constitution of Argentina (1853).

The Argentine Constitution of 1853 was an attempt to unite the unstable and young country of the United Provinces of the Río de la Plata under a single law, creating as well the different organisms needed to run a country. This constitution was finally approved after failed attempts in 1813 (see Assembly of 1813), 1819 and 1831 (Pacto Federal).

Structure of the Law in Argentina

Constitution of Argentina
 Bill of Rights
 Form of Government
 Delegation of Powers to the National 
 Precedence of Laws - International Treaties
 Provincial Constitutions

Civil Code of Argentina
The first Civil Code was written by Argentine jurist Dalmacio Vélez Sársfield, and came into effect on January 1, 1871 and remained law until 1 August 2015, when it was replaced by a new Civil and Commercial Code - Código Civil y Comercial de la Nación.

The 1871 Argentine Civil Code was largely inspired by the Spanish legal tradition, and also by the Brazilian Civil Code, the Spanish Civil Code of 1851, the Napoleonic code and the Chilean Civil Code. The sources of this Civil Code also include various theoretical legal works, mainly of the great French jurists of the 19th century. It was the first Civil Law that consciously adopted as its cornerstone the distinction between rights and obligations and real property rights, thus distancing itself from the French model.

The new  Código Civil y Comercial de la Nación brings many changes, in particular the modernization of family law.

Penal Code of Argentina

Argentine sources of law
 Statutory Law
 Case Law
 Custom
 General Principles of Law
 Analogy
 Equity

Argentine interpretation of legislation
 Methods of Interpretation
 Sources of Interpretation
 Special Rules of Interpretation

Argentine law jurisdictions
 Jurisdiction
 Competence
 Levels of Jurisdiction
 Jurisdiction of the Argentine Courts in the International Sphere

See also
Legal systems of the world
Politics of Argentina

References
Edwin Montefiore Borchard. Guide to the law and legal literature of Argentina, Brazil and Chile. Law Library of Congress. Government Printing Office. Washington. 1917. Internet Archive

External links

 
Law in South America